The 2007 Ohio State Buckeyes football team represented Ohio State University during the 2007 NCAA Division I FBS football season. The Buckeyes were coached by Jim Tressel and played their home games in Ohio Stadium in Columbus, Ohio. Tressel led the Buckeyes to their fourth Big Ten Conference championship and third BCS National Championship Game in six years. The team finished the season with overall record of 11–2, with losses to conference-rival Illinois and LSU in the 2008 BCS National Championship Game.

Schedule

Previous season
The 2006 Buckeyes squad finished the season as Big Ten Conference champions and ranked #2 in the final AP and Coaches' polls. They finished the regular season undefeated and advanced to the 2007 BCS National Championship Game where they lost to the Florida Gators, ending the season with a record of 12–1.

Preseason
On March 6, Coach Jim Tressel announced the hiring of Assistant Coach Taver Johnson. Johnson is a native of Cincinnati and a graduate of Wittenberg University. He had spent most of his coaching career at Miami University and had a very brief stint with the Oakland Raiders. Coach Johnson will replace Tim Beckman, who left Ohio State to become Defensive Coordinator at Oklahoma State University. Coach Johnson will coach the Cornerbacks.

Watch lists
Linebackers James Laurinaitis and Marcus Freeman along with defensive end Vernon Gholston were among the list of 65 players under consideration for the Bednarik Award while Chris "Beanie" Wells was on the 65-player list for the Maxwell Award.

Coaching staff
 Jim Tressel – Head Coach (7th year)
 Jim Bollman – Offensive Line/OC (7th year)
 Joe Daniels – Quarterbacks (7th year)
 Luke Fickell – Co-Defensive Coordinator / Linebackers Coach (6th year)
 Jim Heacock – Defensive Coordinator / Defensive Line (12th year)
 Paul Haynes – Defensive Safeties (3rd year)
 Darrell Hazell – Assistant Head Coach / Wide Receivers (4th year)
 Taver Johnson – Defensive Cornerbacks (1st year)
 John Peterson – Tight Ends Coach / Recruiting Coordinator (4th year)
 Dick Tressel – Running Backs (7th year)
 Bob Tucker – Director of Football Operations (13th year)
 Stan Jefferson – Director of Player Development (4th year)
 Eric Lichter – Director of Football Performance (2nd year)
 Butch Reynolds – Speed Coordinator (3rd year)
 Jeff Uhlenhake – Strength Coordinator (1st year)

Results

Youngstown State

Akron

Washington

Northwestern

Minnesota

Purdue

Kent State

Michigan State

Penn State

Wisconsin

    
    
    
    
    
    
    
    
    

Ohio State sets record with 20th straight Big Ten win.

Illinois

Michigan

National Championship Game

On January 7, 2008 the Buckeyes played at the BCS National Championship game in New Orleans, Louisiana in the Louisiana Superdome. This was the first time in the school's history that the football team had played back to back National Championship games. The Buckeyes ended up losing the game to the Louisiana State University Tigers, 38–24. After a strong initial start (a 10–0 run in the first quarter in favor of the Buckeyes), the LSU Tigers went on one of their own, 31–0, from the first to third quarters. Two key pivotal special teams plays contributed to the LSU run, one being a blocked 38 yard Ryan Pretorius (Ohio State) field goal in the first quarter, and a roughing the kicker penalty committed by Austin Spitler (Ohio State) on a punt that extended an LSU touchdown drive in the third. Both teams scored 14 points in the second half which lead to a Tigers' victory due to the 2nd quarter LSU scoring deficit.

Rankings

Players

Roster

2008 NFL draftees

References

Ohio State
Ohio State Buckeyes football seasons
Big Ten Conference football champion seasons
Ohio State Buckeyes football